Desmiphora chemsaki is a species of beetle in the family Cerambycidae. It was described by Giesbert in 1998. It is known from Mexico.

References

Desmiphora
Beetles described in 1998